Algonquin Peak is in the MacIntyre Range in the town of North Elba, in Essex County, New York.  It is the second highest mountain in New York, and one of the 46 Adirondack High Peaks in Adirondack Park. Its name comes from its reputedly being on the Algonquian side of a nearby informal boundary between the Algonquian and their Iroquois neighbors.

Algonquin is popular with hikers, accessible from the popular Adirondak Loj trailhead near Heart Lake outside Lake Placid for a day trip.  While the climb is shorter than that of nearby Mount Marcy, it is steeper, requiring almost as much vertical ascent in a considerably shorter distance.

The usual route is via the blue-blazed Van Hoevenberg Trail  to its junction with the yellow-blazed MacIntyre Range Trail and following that the remaining  to the summit, during which the route gets progressively steeper and rockier, going over many steep rock chutes called "slides".

The mountain's summit is an alpine zone above tree line, and views of the surrounding high peaks are available in all directions. However, the large numbers of hikers on the summit have in the past caused damage to the fragile plant life, and strict regulations have been put in place both at the trailhead and on the summit (all hikers must sign in; no dogs are allowed without a leash) to protect it. On busy days a Summit Steward both reminds hikers of these rules and educates them about the ecosystem.

Less frequently, the mountain is approached from the southeast via the steep, narrow,  Boundary Trail from Lake Colden.  This trail is also dangerous because of the poor markings and steep, slippery slides that streams have formed on.

Notes

Gallery

External links 

 
 
 
 Algonquin Peak hike and trip report. September 2015.
Hiking Algonquin Peak. PureAdirondacks.com

Mountains of Essex County, New York
Tourist attractions in Essex County, New York
Mountains of New York (state)